The 1998–99 Danish Cup was the 45th installment of the Danish Cup, the highest football competition in Denmark.

Final

References

1998-99
1998–99 domestic association football cups
Cup